An owner's engineer, also known as the client's engineer, is a term often given to the representative of the commissioning company of a construction or engineering project.

Most often an owner's engineer is a subcontracted role; undertaken to protect the owner's interests by ensuring that the technical and build contractors are adhering sufficiently to the project specification. Owner's engineers also fill gaps in resources and expertise for a project.

Project management function 

Ordinarily, the role is separate from a project manager's role, as this often involves overseeing the technical and commercial due-diligence aspects of the works.
Owners engineers are usually a "third party" overseeing the executing parties activities throughout the project life

Functions often include:
 Project evaluation, feasibility, and planning reviews
 Contract reviews (non-legal)
 Monitoring of construction progress
 Monitoring of equipment and material compliance with specifications
 Engineering design and planning reviews
 Schedule analysis and optimization
 Equipment commissioning and verification test
 Operational and maintenance review
 Cost/Benefit analysis
 General reporting to owner on the basis of technical and business competence

See also
 Project management
 Independent engineer

References

Construction management
Engineering occupations